The 1904 United States presidential election in Oregon took place on November 8, 1904. All contemporary 45 states were part of the 1904 United States presidential election. State voters chose four electors to the Electoral College, which selected the president and vice president.

This election would solidify Oregon as a one-party Republican bastion, which it would remain at a Presidential level apart from the 1910s GOP split until Franklin D. Roosevelt rose to power in 1932, and apart from a very short New Deal interlude at state level until the “Revolution of 1954”. Democratic representation in the Oregon legislature would never exceed fifteen percent during this period, and no Democrat other than Woodrow Wilson would henceforth carry even one county in the state before the Great Depression. Republican primaries would become the chief mode of competition: indeed Oregon became in this election year the first Western state to utilize the direct primary.

President Roosevelt was extremely popular in Oregon because of his policies of reforming the railroads, creating a Department of Commerce and Labor and conserving the forest resources that were at the time heavily exploited by big business. Parker's re-emphasis on the Gold Standard, which harked back to Grover Cleveland, aroused no enthusiasm in Oregon. Nor did his opposition to Roosevelt's policy of imperialism in the Pacific, with the result that Parker's showing was the worst-ever by any major-party nominee in Oregon except for his mentor Cleveland twelve years previously. At the same time, Roosevelt's performance remains the best ever by any Presidential candidate since Oregon's statehood in 1859. Parker did not win thirty percent in a single county, and overall took just a little over nineteen percent of Oregon's ballots.

Socialist nominee Eugene V. Debs, whose campaign focused on trust-busting and the evils of monopoly, traveled all around the nation in a charismatic campaign that netted him over four hundred thousand votes nationwide. Although he did not outpoll Parker in any Oregon county, Debs nonetheless received over eight percent of the vote.

Results

Results by county

See also
 United States presidential elections in Oregon

References

Notes

Oregon
1904
1904 Oregon elections